Krista Johanna Mikkonen (born 15 November 1972 in Hamina, Finland) is a Finnish politician for the Green League, member of parliament, and Finland's Minister of the Interior. She lives in Joensuu, but spent her childhood in Koria. She was first elected to the Finnish Parliament in the 2015 parliamentary election for the Savo-Karelia constituency. Between 2016 and 2019, Mikkonen was the chairperson of the Green League parliamentary group. Mikkonen graduated with a Master of Philosophy degree from the University of Joensuu (present day University of Eastern Finland) in North Karelia in 2003.

Mikkonen was elected as a Member of the Finnish Parliament in the 2015 parliamentary elections, with 4624 votes, and re-elected in 2019 with 6204 votes. Her constituency is Savonia-Karelia. She had previously been nominated in three parliamentary elections in 1999, 2007 and 2011 in the constituency of North Karelia.

Other activities
Mikkonen was also a member of the advisory board of the National Audit Office of Finland (NAOF) between 2017 and 2019.

References

1972 births
Living people
21st-century Finnish women politicians
Female interior ministers
Green League politicians
Members of the Parliament of Finland (2015–19)
Members of the Parliament of Finland (2019–23)
Minister of the Environment of Finland
People from Hamina
Women members of the Parliament of Finland
Women government ministers of Finland